Cilfrew television relay station is sited on a hill south of the village of Tonna, at least 2 km across the valley from Cilfrew in the Neath Valley. It was originally built in 1981 as a fill-in relay for UHF analogue colour television serving the villages of Cilfrew itself, Aberdulais and Tonna. It consists of a 30 m self-supporting lattice mast standing on land which is itself about 80 m above sea level. The transmissions are beamed to the north. The Cilfrew transmission station is owned and operated by Arqiva.

Cilfrew transmitter re-radiates the signal received off-air from Kilvey Hill about 12 km to the southwest. When it came, the digital switchover process for Cilfrew duplicated the timing at the parent station, with the first stage taking place on Wednesday 12 August 2009 and the second stage was completed on Wednesday 9 September 2009, with the Kilvey Hill transmitter-group becoming the first in Wales to complete digital switchover. After the switchover process, analogue channels had ceased broadcasting permanently and the Freeview digital TV services were radiated at an ERP of 3 W each.

Channels listed by frequency

Analogue television

September 1981 - 1 November 1982

1 November 1981 - 12 August 2009
When Channel 4 launched in 1982, Cilfrew (being in Wales) transmitted the S4C variant.

Analogue and digital television

12 August 2009 - 9 September 2009
The UK's digital switchover commenced at Kilvey Hill (and therefore at Cilfrew and all its other relays) on 12 August 2009. Analogue BBC Two Wales on channel 45 was first to close, and ITV Wales was moved from channel 49 to channel 45 for its last month of service. Channel 49 was replaced by the new digital BBC A mux which started up in 64-QAM and at full power (i.e. 3 W).

Digital television

9 September 2009 - present
The remaining analogue TV services were closed down and the digital multiplexes took over on two of the original analogue channels' frequencies, BBC B being given the new allocation of channel 42.

13 March 2013
As a side-effect of frequency-changes elsewhere in the region to do with clearance of the 800 MHz band for 4G mobile phone use, Cilfrew's "BBC A" multiplex will have to be moved from channel 49 to channel 39.

References

External links
The Transmission Gallery: Cilfrew 

Transmitter sites in Wales